Andrew Pick O'Meara (March 23, 1907 – September 30, 2005) was a United States Army four-star general who served as Commander-in-Chief, United States Southern Command from 1961 to 1965, and Commander-in-Chief, United States Army Europe/Commander, Central Army Group from 1965 to 1967.

Military career
O'Meara was born on March 23, 1907, in West Bend, Wisconsin. He graduated from the United States Military Academy in 1930 and was commissioned in the field artillery. He began his career in the horse artillery with the 4th Field Artillery from 1931 to 1934. Other early assignments included teaching physics at West Point and various staff assignments. He married the former Ellen Fraser (1906–1995) in 1933.

O'Meara served as a battery commander in the 4th Armored Division in 1941, and in 1942 took command of the 94th Field Artillery Battalion. By the end of World War II he was the Assistant Artillery Commander of VII Corps. Following the war, he attended the Command and General Staff College in 1946, and the National War College from 1951 to 1952.

During the Korean War O'Meara was the artillery commander for the 7th Infantry Division, and later the artillery commander for IX Corps. Promoted to brigadier general in 1952, he earned the Silver Star in 1953 for reconnaissance near Kumhwa.

O'Meara spent the years after Korea working in research and development for the army, first with the Research & Development Division of the Army General Staff, then as Deputy Chief of Research & Development for the United States Army from 1955 to 1957. He then took command of the 4th Armored Division in 1957. From 1959 to 1961, he was assigned to France as director of military assistance for the United States European Command followed by command of the United States Southern Command and United States Army Europe.

O'Meara was an avid squash player, and during his tenure at both SOUTHCOM and United States Army Europe ordered the installation of squash courts at bases under his command.

Decorations
O'Meara's awards and decorations included the Army Distinguished Service Medal with oak leaf cluster, the Silver Star, the Legion of Merit with oak leaf cluster, the Bronze Star Medal, and the Air Medal.

Post-military
O'Meara retired from the army in 1967, settling in the Washington, D.C., area. He died on September 30, 2005, of a stroke at the age of 98 in Arlington, Virginia, and was buried in Arlington National Cemetery. He was preceded in death by his wife and a daughter, and survived by a son and a daughter, 13 grandchildren and 26 great-grandchildren.

References

1907 births
2005 deaths
United States Army generals
United States Army personnel of World War II
United States Army personnel of the Korean War
Recipients of the Silver Star
Recipients of the Legion of Merit
Recipients of the Air Medal
Recipients of the Distinguished Service Medal (US Army)
United States Military Academy alumni
United States Army Command and General Staff College alumni
Burials at Arlington National Cemetery
People from West Bend, Wisconsin
Military personnel from Wisconsin